Richard Elmer "King Tut" King (September 15, 1904 - December 29, 1966) was an American professional baseball first baseman in the Negro leagues. He played with the Cincinnati/Indianapolis Clowns in 1943, 1945, and 1948.

King was known more for performing pantomime comedy acts than his playing ability. He often worked alongside dwarf Spec Bebop, where the two performed a rowboat routine. King was also known for his oversized first baseman's mitt. He eventually transitioned away from playing altogether, but remained associated with the Clowns until his retirement in 1959.

References

External links
 and Seamheads

Indianapolis Clowns players
Cincinnati Clowns players
1904 births
1966 deaths
Baseball shortstops
Baseball players from Florida
20th-century African-American sportspeople